John Peter William Durack, QC (1888–1978), also known as Roaring Jack Durack or Black Jack Durack, was an Australian lawyer. He was part of the Durack dynasty of the Kimberley region of Western Australia.

Biography
Durack was born to Jerry "Galway" Durack and Francis Neale.

After being articled to ML Moss KC, Durack was admitted to the bar in August 1913, and took up practice on Howard Street.

Durack represented farmers, tradesmen and unionists, workers, lumpers, bar staff, belleagured husbands and wives, politicians, store owners and recent migrants. He was involved in divorce, licensing, probate, criminal, and commercial cases. He was appointed a Kings Counsel in June 1939, at the age of fifty. One case in the 1950s went to the Privy council in London.

Durack continued practising law at Dwyer Durack until the 1970s, when he was well into his eighties.

He was president of the Law Society of Western Australia from 1943 to 1945.

Walter Dwyer came to Perth from a busy practice in the thriving gold mining town of Kalgoorlie, where he had been actively involved in industrial disputes within the mining arena.

Durack was at school at Christian Brothers College on St George's Terrace in Perth at the time of the trial of Banjo for the murder of his father Galway Jerry; where JP Durack ran along the Swan River bank from School to the Supreme court and called out to Banjo: "Why did you shoot the Boss?". – "Oh Jack 1 Devil devil been jum up"!

He married Pleasance Rowe in 1922 aged 36. They lived at the historic Federation Queen Anne house "Strathmore" at 18 Chester Street Subiaco, built in 1905 for Walter David Cookes, founder of the Ezywalkin Boot and Shoe Company of Fremantle.

Durack was a keen horseman and President of the Hunt Club of Western Australia. He went hunting on Wednesdays through Kings Park and purchased a stallion called "Midnight", which he hid in the nearby outbuildings of the historic home "Fairview".

He was the father of Peter Drew Durack, a Rhodes Scholar from Western Australia in 1948, a lawyer and attorney-general in the Malcolm Fraser Federal government from 1977.

Durack died in 1978.

References 

1888 births
1978 deaths
20th-century Australian lawyers
People from the Kimberley (Western Australia)
Australian King's Counsel